Zje (З́ з́; italics: З́ з́) is a letter of the Cyrillic alphabet, formed from З with the addition of an acute accent. It is used in the Montenegrin alphabet. It represents the voiced alveolo-palatal fricative /ʑ/. It corresponds to the Latin Ź.

Origins

It came into official use in mid-2009, with the adoption of the Law on the Official Language in Montenegro.

The letter originates from rural areas in Montenegro.

Computing codes

Being a relatively recent letter, not present in any legacy 8-bit Cyrillic encoding, the letter З́ is not represented directly by a precomposed character in Unicode either; it has to be composed as З+◌́ (U+0301).

See also 

Ź ź : Latin letter Ź
Ž ž : Latin letter Ž
С́ с́ : Cyrillic letter Sje
Cyrillic characters in Unicode

Cyrillic letters
Montenegrin language